Normand D'Amour (born September 22, 1962) is a Canadian actor from Montreal, Quebec. He is most noted for his supporting role in the film Everything Is Fine (Tout est parfait), for which he won the Jutra Award for Best Supporting Actor at the 11th Jutra Awards in 2009, and was nominated for the Genie Award for Best Supporting Actor at the 29th Genie Awards.

Career 
D'Amour has also appeared in other works including Cheech, Maman Last Call, Ice Cream, Chocolate and Other Consolations (Crème glacée, chocolat et autres consolations), Piché: The Landing of a Man (Piché, entre ciel et terre), Adrien (Le Garagiste), Les Salopes, or the Naturally Wanton Pleasure of Skin, Looking for Alexander, Goddess of the Fireflies (La déesse des mouches à feu) and Drunken Birds (Les Oiseaux ivres).

Filmography

Film

Television

References

External links

1962 births
Living people
Canadian male film actors
Canadian male television actors
Male actors from Montreal
French Quebecers
Best Supporting Actor Jutra and Iris Award winners